The football section of Hong Kong Football Club (Abbreviation: HKFC) fields a range of teams at various age divisions in the Hong Kong leagues. The first team currently competes in the Hong Kong Premier League.

History
While the football team has won many titles in the second-tier competition in recent years, they have rarely enjoyed success when playing against the professional sides in the First Division. In 1980 however, "CLUB" as they were commonly known, did manage to avoid relegation from the professional First Division for the first time in their history. One of the highlights of the season was a 1–1 draw with eventual Champions Seiko SA.  On 10 May 1980 at the HK Government Stadium CLUB defeated Kui Tan 1–0 with an 87th-minute penalty scored by John McGunnigle, meaning Kui Tan joined Yuen Long in the drop that year.

In the past few years, HKFC opted not to take promotion to the First Division. In 2006, finally, the club accepted the promotion after winning the Second Division.  After showing initial promise, they lost 4 league matches in a row between March and April 2007 and were relegated to the Second Division.  They did however become champions of the Second Division again in April 2010 and returned to the First Division. Therefore, HKFC is known as the yo-yo club in Hong Kong.

In 2016, two years after the establishment of the fully professional Hong Kong Premier League, HKFC finally decided to seek promotion to the top flight after finishing as runners-up behind Tai Po in the 2015–16 season. Their stay in the top flight only lasted a single season, however, as the club finished bottom in 2016–17 season and dropped back down to the First Division.

HKFC won the First Division for the first time in a century during the 2017–18 season, going unbeaten throughout the entire league campaign. The club declined promotion as they did not want to field a professional side.

After being crowned champions of the 2020–21 Hong Kong First Division League, on 19 August 2021, HKFC accepted the HKFA's invitation to be promoted to the 2021–22 Hong Kong Premier League, after the withdrawals of Happy Valley and Pegasus, having last appeared five years ago in the 2016–17 season.

HKFC Soccer Sevens
The team is known outside Hong Kong for being the host of the annual HKFC Soccer Sevens youth-team seven-a-side tournament which attracts high-profile teams such as Manchester United, Aston Villa and Celtic.

Team staff
{|class="wikitable"
|-
!Position
!Staff
|-
|Head coach||  Tony Hamilton-Bram
|-
|Assistant coach||  Stewart Montgomery 
|-
|Assistant coach||  John Pimlott
|-
|Assistant coach||  Anto Grabo
|-
|Goalkeeping coach||  Justin Wah
|-
|Technical coach||  Stephen Tucker-Roberts

Current squad

First team

 
 
 
 LP
 LP
 

 

 

 

 

Remarks:
LP These players are considered as local players in Hong Kong domestic football competitions.

Notable players
  Jaimes Mckee
  Jack Sealy
  Andy Russell
  James Ha
  Cheng Lai Hin
  Ho Kwok Chuen
  Kwok Kar Lok
  Li Hang Wui
  Robbie Bacon
  Freek Schipper
  Robert Scott
  Gergely Ghéczy
  Calvin Harris
  Yochanan Vollach: Israeli former international who played in the 1970 World Cup Finals

Honours

League
Hong Kong First Division/Hong Kong Premier League (Tier 1)
Champions (1): 1919–20
Hong Kong Second Division/Hong Kong First Division (Tier 2)
Champions (15): 1972–73, 1976–77, 1978–79, 1985–86, 1987–88, 1992–93, 1994–95, 1997–98, 1998–99, 2000–01, 2004–05, 2005–06, 2008–09, 2017–18, 2020–21
Runners Up (5): 1988–89, 2007–08, 2014–15, 2015–16, 2018–19
Hong Kong Third Division/Hong Kong Second Division (Tier 3)
Champions (2): 1978–79, 1986–87

Cup Competitions
Hong Kong Senior Shield
Champions (5): 1898–99, 1907–08, 1915–16, 1918–19, 1921–22
Hong Kong Junior Challenge Shield
Champions (6): 1976–77, 1978–79, 1992–93, 1994–95, 1996–97, 2004–05

See also
 Club of Pioneers
 Lucky Mile

References

External links
Hong Kong Football Club official website
 HKFC Soccer Section
HKFC: Soccer Section official Facebook group
HKFC live scores at Sofascore

Hong Kong Premier League
Hong Kong First Division League
Football clubs in Hong Kong
Association football clubs established in 1886
Happy Valley, Hong Kong
1886 establishments in Hong Kong